Hammie Nixon (January 22, 1908 – August 17, 1984) was an American harmonica player.

Life and career
Born Hammie Nickerson in Brownsville, Tennessee, he began his music career with jug bands in the 1920s. He is best known as a country blues harmonica player, but he also played the kazoo, guitar and jug. He played with the guitarist Sleepy John Estes for half a century, first recording with Estes in 1929 for Victor Records. He also recorded with Little Buddy Doyle, Lee Green, Clayton T. Driver, Charlie Pickett and Son Bonds.

During the 1920s Nixon helped to pioneer the use of the harmonica as a rhythm instrument in a band setting, rather than as a novelty solo instrument. After Estes died in 1979, Nixon played with the Beale Street Jug Band (also called the Memphis Jug Band). Nixon's last recording, "Tappin' That Thing" (Hmg Records), was recorded shortly before his death in 1984, in Jackson, Tennessee.

See also
Blues harp
List of harmonica blues musicians
List of harmonicists

References

1908 births
1984 deaths
People from Brownsville, Tennessee
American blues harmonica players
Country blues musicians
Harmonica blues musicians
Musicians from Tennessee
20th-century American musicians